Allow may refer to:
River Allow, river in Ireland
Allow, a low-carbon aluminium brand by Rusal
"Allow", a directive in the website robots exclusion standard
"Allow", a song on the 2016 album Bad Hair Extensions

See also

Allowance (disambiguation)
Alau (disambiguation)